Awilco LNG is a Norwegian LNG transportation company. The company was listed on Oslo Axess on 6 September 2011.

Fleet
The technical management of the fleet is handled by subsidiary Awilco LNG Technical management AS. As of 2023, Awilco's fleet is composed of two 156,000 m3 vessels. In 2023, the company charters its vessels for approximately $120,000 per trading day.

Current fleet

Former fleet

Incidents 
In 2019, the WilForce was involved in a collision off the coast of Singapore. The WilForce collided with the bulker Western Moscow, owned by Ratu Shipping. A court found the bulker primarily liable for the collision, which caused $17.6 million in damages. The company stated that no bunker fuel was spilled and that the LNG tanks were empty at the time.

References

External links 

 Awilco LNG 

Shipping companies of Norway
Gas shipping companies
Companies based in Oslo
Companies listed on Oslo Axess